Gymnopilus foedatus is a species of mushroom in the family Hymenogastraceae.

See also

List of Gymnopilus species

External links
Gymnopilus foedatus at Index Fungorum

foedatus
Taxa named by Charles Horton Peck